Hulettia is an extinct genus of ray-finned fish found in the Morrison Formation in the western United States, measuring approximately three to four inches in length. This fish genus contains one species, H. americana. Its body was covered in thick prominent scales, and its name is based on Hulett, Wyoming, a locale which is near the Morrison Formation. Discovered specimens show evidence of predation upon the smaller species of fish Todiltia that inhabited the Jurassic Lake Todilto, and another specimen discovered in the Bathonian coastal sandstone, in the Sundance Formation of South Dakota. Both specimens are complete skeletons with no fragmentary remains or dubious anomalies amongst the bones recovered.

Description
It is believed that the colossal deposits of uranium that are found in Todilto Formation and the Morrison Formation deterred other organisms from the area, and isolated the two species, protecting them from predation and trophic competition until their disappearance from the fossil record in the Cretaceous.

See also

 Prehistoric fish
 List of prehistoric bony fish
 Paleobiota of the Morrison Formation

References

External links
 Bony fish in the online Sepkoski Database

Prehistoric neopterygii
Morrison fauna